Marcel Ruschel Stürmer (born 27 July 1985) is a Brazilian artistic roller skater.

Born in Lajeado, RS, Stürmer is generally considered Brazil's best skater ever, judging by the number of titles won throughout his career.

References

1985 births
Living people
People from Lajeado
Brazilian artistic roller skaters
Pan American Games gold medalists for Brazil
Pan American Games medalists in roller skating
Roller figure skaters at the 2003 Pan American Games
Roller figure skaters at the 2007 Pan American Games
Roller figure skaters at the 2011 Pan American Games
Roller figure skaters at the 2015 Pan American Games
World Games gold medalists
Competitors at the 2013 World Games
South American Games silver medalists for Brazil
South American Games medalists in roller sports
Competitors at the 2010 South American Games
Medalists at the 2003 Pan American Games
Medalists at the 2007 Pan American Games
Medalists at the 2011 Pan American Games
Medalists at the 2015 Pan American Games
Sportspeople from Rio Grande do Sul
21st-century Brazilian people